Cavolinia tridentata is a species of sea butterflies, floating and swimming sea snails or sea slugs, pelagic marine gastropod molluscs in the family Cavoliniidae.

Formae
 Cavolinia tridentata f. affinis (d'Orbigny, 1836)
 Cavolinia tridentata f. kraussi Tesch, 1913
 Cavolinia tridentata f. tridentata (Forskål, 1775)

Description 
The maximum recorded shell length is 20 mm.

Distribution
This marine species has a wide distribution: European waters, the Mediterranean Sea, the Atlantic Ocean (Azores, Cape Verde), the Northwest Atlantic (Gulf of Maine), Caribbean Sea, the Gulf of Mexico, the Lesser Antilles, Indian Ocean (Mascarene Basin), the Indo-Pacific and off New Zealand.

Habitat 
Minimum recorded depth is 0 m. Maximum recorded depth is 4791 m.

Notes

References
 Drivas, J. & M. Jay (1988). Coquillages de La Réunion et de l'île Maurice
 Rosenberg, G. 1992. Encyclopedia of Seashells. Dorset: New York. 224 pp. page(s): 122 
 Gofas, S.; Le Renard, J.; Bouchet, P. (2001). Mollusca, in: Costello, M.J. et al. (Ed.) (2001). European register of marine species: a check-list of the marine species in Europe and a bibliography of guides to their identification. Collection Patrimoines Naturels, 50: pp. 180–213 
  Rolán E., 2005. Malacological Fauna From The Cape Verde Archipelago. Part 1, Polyplacophora and Gastropoda
 Willan, R. (2009). Opisthobranchia (Mollusca). In: Gordon, D. (Ed.) (2009). New Zealand Inventory of Biodiversity. Volume One: Kingdom Animalia. 584 pp 
 Rosenberg, G., F. Moretzsohn, and E. F. García. 2009. Gastropoda (Mollusca) of the Gulf of Mexico, Pp. 579–699 in Felder, D.L. and D.K. Camp (eds.), Gulf of Mexico–Origins, Waters, and Biota. Biodiversity. Texas A&M Press, College Station, Texas. 
 Janssen A.W. (2012) Late Quaternary to Recent holoplanktonic Mollusca (Gastropoda) from bottom samples of the eastern Mediterranean Sea: systematics, morphology. Bollettino Malacologico 48 (suppl. 9): 1-105.

Cavoliniidae
Molluscs of the Atlantic Ocean
Molluscs of the Indian Ocean
Molluscs of the Mediterranean Sea
Molluscs of the Pacific Ocean
Molluscs of the Azores
Gastropods of Cape Verde
Molluscs described in 1775
Taxa named by Peter Forsskål